Sandwich Glass may refer to:

Laminated glass, a safety glass formed by "sandwiching" layers of glass with other material
Glass products of the Boston and Sandwich Glass Company
Sandwich Glass Museum
Gold glass or gold sandwich glass, where a decorative design in gold leaf is fused between two layers of glass

See also
Sandwich class